Amir Lowery (born December 26, 1983) is a 2020 American political candidate and former soccer player.

Career

College and Amateur
Lowery attended Wake Forest University where he played on the men's soccer team from 2001 to 2004. In 2001, Lowery played for the Chesapeake Dragons of the USL Premier Development League. During the summer of 2004, he played one season with the Carolina Dynamo.

Professional
In February 2005, Colorado Rapids selected Lowery in the third round (45th overall) in the 2005 MLS SuperDraft. He was also selected by the Philadelphia KiXX in the fourth round of the Major Indoor Soccer League draft, but signed with the Rapids.  Lowery played only two first team games and eleven reserve games with the Rapids during the 2005 season. On August 5, 2005, the Rapids sent Lowery on loan to Atlanta Silverbacks in the USL First Division.  He played five games with the Silverbacks. The Rapids waived him on March 3, 2006.

Lowery signed with Kansas City Wizards for the 2007 season and played thirteen reserve games. He played in a crowded midfield and eventually asked to play center back.  The Wiz released him following the season and he signed with San Jose Earthquakes on May 22, 2008.  In March 2009, he signed with Carolina RailHawks in the USL First Division where he enjoyed considerable success being one of the leaders on the team in minutes played over his two seasons there.

On March 30, 2011, Lowery signed a one-year contract with Montreal Impact of the North American Soccer League.

After one season with Montreal, Lowery signed in February 2012 for a second spell with Carolina RailHawks.

Career stats

Politics
In 2020, Lowery announced he will be running for District of Columbia’s Delegate to the United States House of Representatives.

References

External links
 Carolina RailHawks bio 
 MLS player profile

1983 births
Living people
People from Washington, D.C.
American soccer players
Atlanta Silverbacks players
North Carolina FC players
North Carolina Fusion U23 players
Chesapeake Dragons players
Colorado Rapids players
Expatriate soccer players in Canada
FC Honka players
Association football midfielders
Montreal Impact (1992–2011) players
Major League Soccer players
North American Soccer League players
San Jose Earthquakes players
Sporting Kansas City players
USL First Division players
USL League Two players
USSF Division 2 Professional League players
Wake Forest Demon Deacons men's soccer players
Colorado Rapids draft picks